The history of the Jews in Mauritania dates back to the time of the fall of the Jewish state in 70 CE, when they spread across Roman North Africa. Many Jews have entered the modern day country of Mauritania as tourists or visitors.

History
After 429 CE, during the rule of the Romans and the Vandals, Jewish communities flourished in Mauritania. The Byzantines gained control of Mauritania in 534 CE, following which a series of restrictive laws were passed that infringed upon the rights of Jews, Donatists, Arians, and other religious dissenters.

In January 2020, the Mauritanian foreign affairs ministry official Mariem Aouffa was forced to resign after posting an antisemitic tweet that dismissed a French anti-slavery activist as a "Jew" and an "enemy of the Muslim religion".

According to the Mauritanian abolitionist activist Abdel Nasser Ould Ethmane, many Mauritanians believe that discussions of slavery and abolitionism are due to an "influence from the worldwide Jewish conspiracy."

See also 
Foreign relations of Mauritania#Israel

References

External links
Mauritania, Jews Were Here

 
Jews and Judaism in West Africa